Syndromic microphthalmia is a class of rare congenital anomalies characterized by microphthalmia with other non-ocular malformations. Syndromic microphthalmia accounts for 60 to 80% of all cases of microphthalmia. Syndromic microphthalmias are caused by mutations in genes related to embryonic craniofacial development, and they are typically classified by their genetic cause.

Classification 
If microphthalmia is present, genetic testing can be done to inform a specific diagnosis of a named syndrome. Twenty to forty percent of anophthalmia and microphthalmia patients are diagnosed with a recognized syndrome. There are 14 numbered syndromic microphthalmies (MCOPS) primarily defined by their ocular manifestations:

In addition to MCOPS1–14, there are many genetic syndromes of which microphthalmia is a key feature:

Notes

References 

Genetic disorders by system
Congenital disorders of eyes
Rare diseases